Clare Rural District was a rural district in the county of West Suffolk, England. It was created in 1894, comprising those parishes in the Risbridge rural sanitary district which were in Suffolk. 

On 1 April 1935 it was enlarged by the addition of the parishes of Lidgate and Ousden from the disbanded Moulton Rural District, Cavendish and Hawkedon from the Melford Rural District and Depden from the Thingoe Rural District. It was named after and administered from Clare.  

Since 1 April 1974 it has formed part of the Borough of St Edmundsbury.

Parishes

Statistics

References

History of Suffolk
Districts of England created by the Local Government Act 1894
Districts of England abolished by the Local Government Act 1972
Rural districts of England